Bank BSU or Bank BSU Cooperative is a Swiss regional bank located in  Uster, canton of Zurich. It was founded in 1836 as a savings bank of the district Uster and in 1892 it was registered using the name Sparkasse des Bezirkes Uster as a cooperative. Since 2012 the bank uses its current name.

In 2001 was opened a branch office in Dübendorf and in 2008 at Volketswil.

Services 
The focus of BSU is on
 retail banking
 mortgage lending
 private banking
 banking for small and medium enterprises, etc.
It employs about 40 people and the balance sheet total was 977 million CHF in 2015.

Bank BSU is an independent regional bank of the RBA holding company.

References 
Article contains translated text from Bank BSU on the German Wikipedia retrieved on 7 March 2017.

External links 
Homepage in German

Banks of Switzerland
Banks established in 1836
Swiss companies established in 1836
Companies based in the canton of Zürich